Doug Kauffman (born September 18, 1973) is an American curler from Hayward, California.

At the national level, he is a two-time United States men's curling champion (2001, 2004). 

Kauffman picked up curling in his late twenties while living in Seattle, having seen it on television and then watching the 1997 National Championship live at the local Granite Curling Club.

Teams

Personal life
Kauffman married to Katie, they have one son Connor.

He works as Director of Golf at the Members Club at Aldarra.

He started curling in 1998 when he was at the age of 29. In the past he has coached his son's U-18 team, composed of skip Connor Kauffman along with Andrew Bell, Alex Couckuyt and Arjun Thomas.

References

External links

Living people
1969 births
Sportspeople from Hayward, California
American male curlers
American curling champions